Andrew McNee (born December 25, 1974) is a Canadian actor, possibly best known for starring as Coach Malone in the movie Diary of a Wimpy Kid and Hoss in Scary Movie 4. He graduated from high school in 1993.

Filmography

Film

Television

External links

Living people
1974 births
Canadian male film actors
Canadian male television actors
Canadian male voice actors